TFBoys (stylized in all caps), also known as The Fighting Boys, is a popular Chinese idol group that consists of three members: Karry Wang, Roy Wang, and Jackson Yee. The group debuted on August 6, 2013 with their first single album "Start of Love" at the young ages of 12 and 13 years old. Within a year of their debut, TFBoys became one of the most popular artists in China with their hit song "青春修炼手册 Manual of Youth" and gained widespread popularity throughout Asia. The group as a whole have an estimated commercial value of more than US$430 million (CN¥3 billion) combined from endorsements and branding as of 2018, and their average sales per member from band merchandises alone amasses more than US$17 million per month. 

They are often cited as one of the most influential acts to shape the Mando-pop industry in recent years, helping to spread Chinese culture internationally, and are dubbed as one of the most successful Chinese boy bands to hit mainstream media in terms of sales, influence, and endorsement value. As of 2018, they have a gathered more than 200 million followers combined on Sina Weibo and have ranked in Forbes China Celebrity 100 for 4 consecutive years since 2015, becoming among the youngest celebrities to make it onto the list. The band is seen as a spiritual successor of former Taiwanese band Xiao Hu Dui by the media due to high similarities between them.

Career

2013–2014: Formation and debut
On June 1, 2013, the TF boys released a cover video "洋蔥" (Onion) by Aska Yang, as well by Taiwanese rock band Mayday with trainees Roy Wang, Karry Wang and the child TF band. The video went viral and set a record for the highest number of views by a child cover star in Taiwan. On June 5 of that year, they became the first Mainland child stars to appear in Taiwan news.

There were two trainees that were set to debut with Roy and Karry Wang but TF entertainment discovered Jackson Yee. His skill set focused on dance specifically Latin and HipHop styles. Although he was a newcomer, he had starred in many TV advertisements and dramas.

TFBoys first appeared on August 6, 2013 with a promotional video sent out by TF entertainment called "Ten Years". October 4, they held a showcase of their debut ep at the Sun Moonlight(SML) Center in Yuzhong District, Chongqing. They debuted on October 18, 2013 with the release of a single album "Start to Heart", including the title track "Heart".

The group subsequently released a series of hits in 2014, including "Magic Castle", "For Dreams, Always Be Ready" and "Manual of Youth". Their album "Manual of Youth" went on chart at number 1 on YinYueTai V Charts for 5 consecutive weeks and has won multiple music awards. The album skyrocketed the boys into A-list celebrity status in China.

On August 3, 2014, TFBoys held a fan appreciation meeting for their first anniversary at the Beijing Hualian Changying Shopping Center. After the event, Li Xiaolin, chairperson of International Cooperation Department of China Population Welfare Foundation, and her party issued a letter for TFBoys that stated them as ambassadors for the charity "Happy Smiles". TFBoys have been giving donations to children that suffer from cleft lip and palate through their large social media platform. The number of topic interactions on this issue has exceeded 800 million. At the time of their first anniversary, it has raised more than 370,000 yuan. A total of nearly 40,000 netizens participated in the donation. The donation helped more than 100 children with cleft lip.

2015–2016: Mainstream popularity, international success and contributions
On January 14, 2015, TFBoys attended the "2014 Weibo Night" ceremony and won the top charity contribution award for their previous year of charities. 
On September 16, they sang a promotional single "Love With You" for the "2015 MusicRadio我要上学 (I want to go to school)" charity project. The project was aimed at left behind children in poverty stricken areas who dream of attending school.

On September 23, they participated in the 2015 Bazzar Star Charity Night and helped raise 4.17 million yuan in funds for the "为爱加速 (I love to Progress)" charity in the Siyuan Basha poverty-stricken county. In November, TFBoys became a public interest spokesperson for the Chongqing Public Security Fire Department. Later on in the year, they attended the "QQ Red Scarf Project" public welfare conference jointly sponsored by Tencent QQ, QQ Space, China Poverty Alleviation Fund and Tencent Public Welfare to customize winter warm clothes for young people in remote and poverty-stricken areas.

TFBoys held their 2nd anniversary fan meeting to a sold-out show at the Master Card Center in Beijing on August 15 entitled "出道兩週年紀念 《TFBoys Fan's Time》". The event was two and a half hours and they sung their best hits including "Manual of Youth" and "Heart".

In September, Jackson Yee appeared on his first solo live broadcast for the video app "美拍 (Beauty Shot)". The number of people that watched live totaled 8.128 million, more than 863 million likes, and had more than 8.529 million comments . He broke the previous record set by his group back in June.

In December, the group released their first EP The Big Dreamer. On the album includes the song "Adore", the lyrics convey the thoughts and feelings of the boys entering puberty (14–15 years old). Lyrics like "I want to share happy things with you", "This is my first time to be nervous around someone" and "Is this love? I still don't understand yet" express the inner emotions of young people. "Adore" was Song of the Year at the ERC Chinese Top Ten Awards. The award shows honors the top 10 biggest hits in mainland China. The EP peaked at number 1 on the Billboard China V chart for 6 weeks.

In 2016, they won Top Group at The 4th V Chart Awards. The group also starred in their own web drama Finding Soul.

2017–present: Individual activities and "Our Time"
In 2017, the group starred in their own drama Boy Hood, an inspirational youth drama which focuses on baseball. The main OST for Boyhood "Go! Amigo" hit number 1 Billboard China V Chart for 4 weeks in a row. They also won Top Group of the Year at the 5th V Chart Awards for a second consecutive time.

On August 11 and 13, TFBoys held their 4th anniversary concert titled 'Alive Four' in Nanjing. On the 13th, they posted on Weibo that they would be donating 100 million yuan to the victims and rescue efforts of the 2017 Jiuzhaigou earthquake.  The earthquake was a 7.0 magnitude and killed more than 25 people.

The same year, the group announced that the members will set up their own personal studios to focus on their own individual activities.

On December 15, 2017, the group released an EP called "Our Time" which featured a solo song from each member.

In early 2018, massive sponsorships came in for each member.

Karry Wang's endorsements range from low price to high-end coverage. His endorsements include: Nike Air Teen Series, OPPO Mobile Phone, Swatch, Snickers,  Jade Dynasty 诛仙 games, Pizza Hut and Rejoice Hair care. He is also a Lancome Makeup and Perfume Ambassador and a Dolce & Gabbana Asia Pacific brand ambassador, having a total of 14 endorsements.

Roy Wang's endorsements have a more international appeal. His includes Paris L'Oreal brand ambassador, H&M China new generation image spokesperson, Oreo brand ambassador, HP Star series spokesperson, Chopard brand ambassador, FILA brand spokesperson, Xiaomi smartphone endorser, and Line Friends global chief creative officer. In March and April 2018, Wang Yuan fans' purchases exceeded 13.93 million yuan alone. In October last year, the "TFBoys Business Value Insight" produced by the First Financial and Economic Data Center wrote: "The price level of the consumer group of Roy Wang influence radiation is the highest among the TFBoys..."

Jackson Yee's endorsements increased immensely in 2018 and vary from high-end luxury brands to local Chinese multinational technology companies. He became the global youth creative officer for Adidas Neo, Asia Pacific spokesperson for Bottega Veneta, China's spokesperson for Parfums Givenchy, global spokesperson for Huawei Nova and Vidal Sassoon, new generation spokesperson for Baidu, brand spokesperson for Kispa, the first ever global spokesperson for Tmall since its launch in 2000 and more. Jack Ma, creator of Alibaba Group that owns Tmall was estimated to have invested more than 3 billion yuan on Jackson for advertising his website. Jackson ranked first for celebrity endorsement value and was named as the most influential celebrity endorser of 2018 by Baidu Baike.

In 2018, TFBoys released a book titled "2023: Non-Fiction Growth Story" for their 5th anniversary to showcase the struggles and successes as a group. On August 2, TFBoys attended the unveiling of their wax figures at Madame Tussauds Shanghai.

On August 9 and August 17, 2018, the group released two singles titled "The Best Years" and "I Like You" respectively. The group held their 5th Anniversary concert at Beijing's Workers' Stadium on August 24.

In 2019, the group released two new singles titled “My Friends” and “Frist Love Confession” on Julys 12 and August 5 Respectively. On August 10, the group held their 6th Anniversary concert “The Fever” at ShenZhen’s BaoAn Central Stadium.

On August 6 2020, the group released two new singles titled “Be With You” and “Light”. On August 22, the group held their 7th Anniversary online concert titled “Chu Qu Wan(日光旅行)” on NetEase Music. The concert was viewed by more than 786,000 fans, and has set the record for the title of “The Most Live Viewers for a Paid Music Concert on a Music Application” on Guinness World Record.

Members

Role in society
TFBoys is considered to be one of the most popular Chinese boy bands and is seen as a Chinese pop-culture sensation. Since their debut in 2013, they have won many major music awards and earned more than 200 million Weibo followers combined. Their sales of band merchandise average more than $17 million per month. Their success was attributed to their fresh school-boy looks, which filled the void of young male idol groups in China; as well as their "wholesome and boy-next-door" image. Their impact has extended beyond the music industry, with their members appearing in films, television shows as well as commercial films.
Due to their image, the group has won a large number of "mother fans", women in their mid–20s to 60s who have developed maternal instincts for the boys.

The group has also amassed a large number of international fans due to their catchy music and versatile talents. The group has contributed in building China's "soft status", by influencing many fans around the world to learn Chinese.

With increased popularity and influence, the group now promotes philanthropic causes. Its members have set up charitable foundations to support education in rural areas and promote environmental protection. The group was ranked No. 1 on the 2017 Charitable Celebrity List in China.

Politics

The government supports the boy band group, which has been featured for four consecutive years (2016–2019) on the CCTV New Year's Gala. The Communist Youth League’s official Weibo account often promotes the group’s activities. On the International Children’s Day in 2015, the Communist Youth League released a video featuring TFBoys singing "We Are the Heirs of Communism", the song of the Young Pioneers. They have been selected as a brand ambassador of China's 2020 Chinese Mars Mission. The band is part of the government's efforts to promote its policies among China's youth. Critic Zhu Dake sees the boy band as serving to provide modernized propaganda.

Artistry
The group's musical style is mainly dance-style music with rap elements, often classified as "bubblegum pop". Their songs have been noted for having uplifting and positive lyrics, which explores the trials of growing up and teenage love, such as "Manual of Youth" and "Imperfect Kid".

Discography

Extended plays

Single albums

Singles

Soundtracks

Promotional songs

Filmography

Feature films

Television dramas

Web dramas

Reality shows

Awards
V Chart Awards

ERC Chinese Top Ten Awards

Top Chinese Music Awards

QQ Music Awards

CSC Music Awards

Fresh Asia Music Chart Award

iQiyi All-Star Carnival

Weibo Night Awards

Mobile Video Festival

References

External links

  

Chinese boy bands
Chinese pop music groups
Chinese idols
Mandopop musical groups
Musical groups established in 2013
Vocal trios
2013 establishments in China